Rościszewo  is a village in Sierpc County, Masovian Voivodeship, in east-central Poland. It is the seat of the gmina (administrative district) called Gmina Rościszewo.

References

Villages in Sierpc County